Franz Ludwick Fick (18 May 1813 – 31 December 1858) was a professor of anatomy at the University of Marburg.

Education
In 1835, he received his MD under Bünger from the University of Marburg.

Career
Fick studied the developmental mechanics of bone growth, especially of the skull. He invented the cerebral phantom - an openable paper model showing the various parts of the brain that became the prototype of openable figures in medical texts. Fick wrote texts on human anatomy and pathology. He studied the mechanism of vision and the function of the retina. He investigated the function and performance of the taste buds and described the anatomy of elephant's ears.

Books by Fick
 Franz Ludwig Fick, Tractatus de illegitimo vasorum cursu hominibus innato cum tabulis duabus, typis Elwerti academicis, 1854.

References
 Neue Deutsche Biographie, Duncker & Humblot: 1953-1990, Vol. 5, pp. 128–129.
 Biographisches Lexikon der hervorragenden Ärzte, Urban & Schwarzenberg: 1962, Vol. 2, p. 515.
  Archiv Rassen-Ges. Biol. 1922-3, Vol. 14, pp. 159–175.
  I. Schnack, Lebensbilder aus Kurhessen und Waldeck 1830-1930, N. G. Elwert: 1939-1958, Vol. 4, pp. 74–82.

External links
 Adolf and Ludwig Fick
 Fick archive
 Anatomy at Marburg

1813 births
1858 deaths
German anatomists